Frost School of Music is the music school at the University of Miami in Coral Gables, Florida. From 1926 to 2003, it was known as University of Miami School of Music.

Academics and programs

The University of Miami's Frost School of Music was one of the original schools of the University of Miami upon its 1926 founding, operating from 1926 until 2003 as University of Miami School of Music. The School today has an enrollment of just over 700 students and offers degree programs in instrumental performance, vocal performance, music engineering, music therapy, music education, music composition, and musical theatre. It also offers Studio Music and jazz degrees for instrumentalists and vocalists. Its Studio Music and Jazz program have consistently ranked among the best in the nation. Frost School of Music also was the first music school in the nation to offer an innovative degree in Music Business and Entertainment Industries and a hands-on music therapy program.

The Frost School of Music's bachelor of arts in music program offers a music major with a liberal arts minor and is a popular choice as a double major for pre-medical, pre-veterinary, pre-dental, and pre-law students who wish to also pursue higher studies in music. A minor in music is also offered for non-music majors. Music majors within different fields can choose to minor in studio music and jazz, music composition, music business and entertainment industries, and dance. The School also offers graduate programs in every music discipline. 

In April 2007, Shelly Berg, American pianist, composer, arranger, orchestrator, and producer, was appointed as the new dean of the Frost School of Music following retirement of James William Hipp.

The Frost School is home to Bruce Hornsby Creative American Music Program, named after Frost School of Music alumnus Bruce Hornsby, a 1977 University of Miami School of Music graduate. The program is an interdisciplinary course of study designed to develop artist and songwriters by immersing them in the diverse traditions that form the foundation of modern American songwriting. In 2019, Frost School of Music's Dean's Suite was named for Japanese rock star Yoshiki following a masterclass to Frost students and a charitable to donation to the school.

Rankings
In its 2022 rankings of universities and colleges, the collegiate ranking company Niche ranks the University of Miami's music program 16th best in the nation. In 2018, Billboard magazine ranked the University of Miami's Frost School of Music as the nation's top music business school. In 2009 U.S. News & World Report ranked the school's jazz program as the second best jazz program in the nation, and ranked the University of Miami School of Music's masters programs among the top 25 in the nation.

Facilities
The University of Miami's Frost School of Music's facilities include the 600-seat Maurice Gusman Concert Hall named for Ukrainian-American businessman Maurice Gusman. The concert hall hosts performances by students, faculty, and guest artists. 

Other school facilities include the 150-seat Victor E. Clarke Recital Hall, The Marta and L. Austin Weeks Music Library and Technology Center (opened in 2005), the Bertha Foster practice building, and the newly-constructed Patricia L. Frost North and South Buildings, home to faculty studios. These facilities, as well as the Rehearsal Center and Volpe Classroom Building, are all located at Frost School of Music on the University of Miami's main campus in Coral Gables, Florida.

Naming
On October 16, 2003, at a gala event launching the University of Miami's "Momentum Campaign" established to raise $1 billion, the university announced a $33 million gift from philanthropists Phillip Frost and his wife Patricia and the plan to rename the University of Miami School of Music as Frost School of Music.

Notable alumni

Michelle Amato, vocalist
Brian Balmages, composer, conductor, music educator
Jeffri W. Bantz, music conductor
Anastasia Barzee, Broadway actress
Elizabeth Caballero, operatic soprano
Lewis Cleale, Broadway actor
Sylvia Constantinidis, classical pianist, composer, conductor, music educator  
Matt Cornwell, composer and producer
Ann Curless, pop music vocalist, Exposé
Kermit Driscoll, jazz bassist 
Mark Egan, jazz bassist, Pat Metheny Group
Ben Folds, alternative rock musician, vocalist, and songwriter
Danny Gottlieb, drummer, Pat Metheny Group
Amy Lee, saxophonist, Jimmy Buffett's Coral Reefer Band
Will Lee, bassist, Late Show with David Letterman
Dawnn Lewis, actress
Carmen Lundy, jazz vocalist, composer
Marvis Martin, operatic soprano
Joel McNeely, composer
Johanna Meier, operatic soprano
Steve Morse, heavy metal guitarist, Dixie Dregs, Deep Purple
Erin O'Donnell, vocalist
Jaelan Phillips, current professional football player, Miami Dolphins
Robert Phillips, classical guitarist
Maria Schneider, composer
Patti Scialfa, vocalist and guitarist, E Street Band, and wife of Bruce Springsteen
Jon Secada, singer, songwriter
Matt Serletic, rock music producer, Collective Soul and Matchbox Twenty
Ed Toth, rock music drummer, Vertical Horizon and Doobie Brothers
James Touchi-Peters, conductor, composer and jazz singer
Bobby Watson, saxophonist
Lari White, singer-songwriter

Notable faculty
Shelly Berg, current dean, Frost School of Music, jazz pianist
Martin Bejerano, jazz piano
John Bitter, former dean, Frost School of Music, 1950-1963
Craig Carothers, songwriter, recording artist
Frank Cooper, musicology
John Daversa, chair, Frost School of Music Studio Music and Jazz
Ivan Davis, pianist
Gary Green, director of bands
JB Floyd, piano
Bertha Foster, former dean, Frost School of Music
William Franklin Lee III, former dean, Frost School of Music, 1964–1982
Brian Lynch, jazz trumpet
Pat Metheny, jazz
Craig Morris, trumpet
Jaco Pastorius, jazz
Bill Porter, audio engineer
Paul Posnak, piano
Dafnis Prieto, jazz drummer and percussionist
Alfred Reed, music business
Santiago Rodriguez, pianist
Jo-Michael Scheibe, choral
Gerard Schwarz, director of orchestral activities
Thomas Sleeper, former director of orchestral activities, 1993-2018
Richard Todd, horn
Paul Wilson, music theorist

See also
List of University of Miami alumni

References

External links
Official site

Educational institutions established in 1926
Education in Miami
Music schools in Florida
Graduate schools in the United States
University of Miami
University subdivisions in Florida
Universities and colleges in Miami-Dade County, Florida
1926 establishments in Florida